Balpyk Derbisaliuly (1705–1780) was a Kazakh military figure. Born in Koksu District in Almaty Province, the Kazakh people named him "Yegiz bi", meaning "twin judges". He was a prominent figure during the Dzungar invasions in Kazakhstan, and headed the Zhalaiyir tribe.

Today the district capital of Koksu District is named after him, Balpyk Bi.

References
National Encyclopedia of Kazakhstan (Vol. 1)

Kazakhstani military personnel
1705 births
1780 deaths